Nachzehrer (German) – Anthropophagous undead
 Nāga (Buddhist and Hindu) – Nature and water spirits, serpentine or human-serpent hybrids
 Naga fireballs (Thai) – Spectral fire
 Nagual (Mesoamerica) – Human-animal shapeshifter
 Naiad (Greek) – Freshwater nymph
 Näkki (Finnish) – Water spirit
 Namahage (Japanese) – Ritual disciplinary demon from the Oga Peninsula
 Namazu (Japanese) – Giant catfish whose thrashing causing earthquakes
 Nando-baba (Japanese) – Old woman who hides under the floor in abandoned storerooms
 Nang Takian (Thai) – Tree spirit
 Nanom-keea-po-da (Abenaki) – Earthquake spirit
 Napaeae (Greek) – Grotto nymph
 Narasimha (Hindu mythology) – Avatar of Vishnu in the form of half-man/half-lion
 Narecnitsi (Slavic) – Fate spirit
 Nariphon (Thai) – Pod people
 Nargun (Gunai) – Water monster
 Nasnas (Arabian) – Half-human, half-demon creature with half a body
 Nav' (Slavic) – Ghost
 Nawao (Hawaiian) – Savage humanoid
 N-dam-keno-wet (Abenaki) – Fish-human hybrid
 Neptune (Roman mythology) – God of freshwater and sea
 Neck (Germanic mythology) – Female water spirit
 Negret (Catalan) – Little people that turn into coins
 Nekomata (Japanese) – Split-tailed magical cat
 Nekomusume (Japanese) – Cat in the form of a girl
 Nemean Lion (Greek) – Lion with impenetrable skin
 Nephilim (Abrahamic mythology) – Gigantic sons of Grigori and human women
 Nereid (Greek) – Nymph daughters of Nereus
 Ngen (Mapuche) – Nature spirit
 Nguruvilu (Mapuche) – Fox-like water snake
 Nian (Chinese) – Predatory animal
 Night hag (Worldwide) –  Supernatural creature, commonly associated with the phenomenon of sleep paralysis.
 Nightmarchers (Hawaiian) – Warrior ghosts
 Nikusui (Japanese) – Monster which appears as a young woman and sucks all of the flesh off of its victim's body
 Nimerigar (Shoshone) – Aggressive little people
 Ningyo (Japanese) – Monkey-fish hybrid
 Ninki Nanka (Western Africa) – Large reptile, possibly a dragon
 Nisse (Scandinavian) – House spirit
 Níðhöggr (Norse) – Dragon
 Nivatakavachas (Hindu) – Ocean demon
 Nix (Germanic) – Female water spirit
 Nobusuma (Japanese) – Supernatural wall, also a monstrous flying squirrel
 Nocnitsa (Slavic) – Nightmare spirit
 Noppera-bō (Japanese) – Faceless ghost
 Nozuchi (Japanese) – Small sea serpent
 Nuckelavee (Scottish) – Malevolent human-horse-fish hybrid
 Nue (Japanese) – Monkey-raccoon dog-tiger-snake hybrid
 Nü Gui (Chinese) – Vengeful female ghost
 Nukekubi (Japanese) – Disembodied, flying head that attacks people
 Nuku-mai-tore (Māori) – Forest spirit
 Nuli (Medieval Bestiary) – Humanoid with backwards, eight-toed feet
 Numen (Roman) – Tutelary spirit
 Nuno (Philippine) – Malevolent little people
 Nuppeppo (Japanese) – Animated chunk of dead flesh
 Nurarihyon (Japanese) – Head-sized ball-like creature that floats in the sea and teases sailors
 Nure-onna (Japanese) – Female monster who appears on the beach
 Nurikabe (Japanese) – Spirit that manifests as an impassable, invisible wall
 Nyami Nyami (Tonga (Zimbabwean) mythology) – Snake-spirit of the Zambezi River
 Nykštukas (Lithuanian) – Cavern spirit
 Nymph (Greek) – Nature spirit

N